ʿAlqama bin Dhi Jadan al-Himyari also Dhu Jadan the Himyari (fl. 6th - 7th century) was an Arab poet from Yemen. He was noted in particular for his poems about the fortresses of Yemen and their destruction including Ghumdan Palace, Baynun Fortress and Silhin Fortress. al-Himyari wrote of Ghumdan Palace:
You have heard of Ghumdan's towers:
From the mountain top it lowers
Well carpentered, with stones for stay,
Plastered with clean, damp, slippery clay;
Oil lamps within it show
At even like the lightening's glow.
This once-new castle is ashes today
The flames have eaten its beauty away.

References

Yemeni poets
7th-century Arabic poets

6th-century Arabs
7th-century Arabs